
Serina can refer to:

Places
 Serina, Lombardy, a comune in the Province of Bergamo, Italy

People
 Serina (Battlestar Galactica), a character from the original Battlestar Galactica (1978) TV series
 Serina (actress), a Japanese actress (born 1985)

Other
 Serina (grape), another name for the Austrian wine grape Blaufrankisch

See also
 Serena (disambiguation)